The Nandi Award for Best Villain winners since 1985:

See also
 Nandi Awards
 Cinema of Andhra Pradesh

References

Villain